Psamateia is an extinct genus of moths within the family Eolepidopterigidae, containing one species, Psamateia calipsa, which is known from the Crato Formation in Brazil.

References

Eolepidopterigoidea
Fossil Lepidoptera
Cretaceous insects
Early Cretaceous animals of South America
Cretaceous Brazil
Fossils of Brazil
Crato Formation
Fossil taxa described in 2002